Djamalidine Atoiyi (born 5 August 1997) is professional footballer who plays as a midfielder. Born in Mayotte, France, he plays for the Comoros national team.

Club career
Atoiyi made his professional debut with Troyes in a 1–1 Ligue 2 tie with Auxerre on 9 December 2016.

International career
Atoiyi made his debut with the Comoros national team in a 0–0 friendly tie with Mauritania on 6 October 2017.

References

External links
 
 L'Equipe Profile 
 
 Sofoot Profile

1997 births
Living people
People from Mayotte
Mayotte footballers
French footballers
Comorian footballers
French sportspeople of Comorian descent
Citizens of Comoros through descent
Association football midfielders
Comoros international footballers
ES Troyes AC players
Thonon Evian Grand Genève F.C. players
AS Saint-Priest players
FC Martigues players
US Marseille Endoume players
Championnat National 2 players
Championnat National 3 players
Ligue 2 players